Polypterus polli, Poll's bichir, is a species of bichir from the Malebo Pool and the lower and central basins of the Congo River.

References

Polypteridae
Taxa named by Jean-Pierre Gosse
Fish described in 1988